Onur Cavit Biriz (born 16 October 1998) is a Turkish windsurfer, who specialized in the RS:X class. He is a student at Izmir University of Economics. He is an alumnus of Cağaloğlu Anadolu Lisesi.

Biriz became champion in the Techno 293 class of 2013 Atatürk Cup Turkish Windsurf Championship held in Istanbul. He took first place in RS:X Youth Turkish Championship in 2014.

Biriz had the 13th place in 2015 ISAF Youth RS:X World Championship held in Malaysia.

He earned a quota spot at the 2016 Summer Olympics and competed as the youngest sailor.

References

1998 births
Turkish windsurfers
Living people
Olympic sailors of Turkey
Sailors at the 2016 Summer Olympics – RS:X
Competitors at the 2018 Mediterranean Games
Mediterranean Games competitors for Turkey
Cağaloğlu Anadolu Lisesi alumni
St. George's Austrian High School alumni
Sailors at the 2020 Summer Olympics – RS:X